The 2003 NCAA Division II men's basketball tournament was the 47th annual single-elimination tournament to determine the national champion of men's NCAA Division II college basketball in the United States.

Officially culminating the 2002–03 NCAA Division II men's basketball season, the tournament featured, for the first time, sixty-four teams from around the country.

The Elite Eight, national semifinals, and championship were played, for the first time, at the Lakeland Center in Lakeland, Florida.

Northeastern State (32–3) defeated Kentucky Wesleyan in the final, 75–64, to win their first Division II national championship. 

It was concurrently Kentucky Wesleyan's sixth straight appearance in the title game (winning in 1999 and 2001), although this appearance, along with that from 2002, would later be vacated by the NCAA.

The winning Redmen were coached by Larry Gipson. Northeastern State's Darnell Hinson was the Most Outstanding Player.

Regionals

East - Charlotte, North Carolina 
Location: Ovens Athletic Center Host: Queens University of Charlotte

South - Winter Park, Florida 
Location: Warden Arena Host: Rollins College

South Central - Stephenville, Texas 
Location: Wisdom Gymnasium Host: Tarleton State University

North Central - Kearney, Nebraska 
Location: Cushing Coliseum Host: University of Nebraska at Kearney

Northeast – Lowell, Massachusetts
Location: Costello Gym Host: University of Massachusetts at Lowell

South Atlantic - Columbus, Georgia 
Location: Lumpkin Center Host: Columbus State University

Great Lakes - Houghton, Michigan 
Location: Student Development Center Gymnasium Host: Michigan Technological University

Kentucky Wesleyan's participation in the 2002-2004 tournaments was vacated by the NCAA due to a widespread problem with athlete eligibility.

West - Laie, Hawaii 
Location: George Q. Cannon Activities Center Host: Brigham Young University-Hawai'i

Elite Eight-Lakeland, Florida
Location: Jenkins Field House Host: Florida Southern College

Note: Kentucky Wesleyan's performance was vacated by the NCAA.

All-tournament team
 Darnell Hinson. Northeastern State (MOP)
 Shon Robinson, Northeastern State
 Derek Cline, Northeastern State
 Marlon Parmer, Kentucky Wesleyan

See also
 2003 NCAA Division II women's basketball tournament
 2003 NCAA Division I men's basketball tournament
 2003 NCAA Division III men's basketball tournament
 2003 NAIA Division I men's basketball tournament
 2003 NAIA Division II men's basketball tournament

References
 2003 NCAA Division II men's basketball tournament jonfmorse.com
 NCAA Division II men's basketball tournament Results

NCAA Division II men's basketball tournament
NCAA Division II basketball tournament
NCAA Division II basketball tournament